Agustín Lanata (c.1890-1967) was an Argentine association football player.  River, Independiente, Banfield and Quilmes.

Career 
Lanata began his career in Independiente, being one of the footballers who played the first match of the Club Atlético Independiente in the Primera División, the top-flight of football in Argentina.

Lanata then moved to River Plate, where he stayed from 1912 to 1916, playing about forty games and scoring four goals. In 1914, Lanata won the Copa de Competencia Jockey Club with the club. That year River qualified to play the Tie Cup, which the club would win being River Plate's first international title after defeating Uruguayan team Bristol by 1-0.

In 1918 Lanata played fleetingly in Boca Juniors, then he went for Banfield and ended his career in the Quilmes Atlético Club.

His grandson, the journalist Jorge Lanata founded in 1987 the paper Pagina/12.

References 

Argentine footballers
Footballers from Buenos Aires
Sportspeople from Avellaneda
Club Atlético Independiente footballers
Club Atlético River Plate footballers
Boca Juniors footballers
Year of birth unknown
1967 deaths
Argentine people of Ligurian descent
Argentine people of Italian descent
Association football defenders
Year of birth uncertain